Vakhrushevskaya is a rural locality (a village) in Dvinitskoye Rural Settlement, Syamzhensky District, Vologda Oblast, Russia. The population was 26 as of 2002.

Geography 
Vakhrushevskaya is located 52 km northeast of Syamzha (the district's administrative centre) by road. Nikulinskaya is the nearest rural locality.

References 

Rural localities in Syamzhensky District